Budgam railway station (also spelled Badgam) is a station on Northern Railway Network of Indian Railways. This station is the headquarter of Jammu–Baramulla line network.

Location
The station is situated in Ompora town of Budgam district, Jammu and Kashmir just 9 km from Lal Chowk, the city centre and 2.5 km from district headquarters.

History

Design

The station features Kashmiri wood architecture, with an intended ambiance of a royal court which is designed to complement the local surroundings to the station. Station signage is predominantly in Urdu, English and Hindi.

Reduced level
The elevation of the station is 1588 m above mean sea level.

See also
 Mazhom railway station
 Srinagar railway station
 Baramulla railway station

References

Railway stations in Budgam district
Firozpur railway division
Railway stations opened in 2008